Air Georgian Limited was a privately owned charter airline based at Toronto Pearson International Airport in Mississauga, Ontario, Canada. Between 2000 and 2020 its main business was its operation as Air Canada Express on a Tier III codeshare with Air Canada for scheduled services on domestic and trans-border routes. Starting in 2020 Air Georgian began focusing on air charters, before ceasing operations in May, after a sale of its assets to Pivot Airlines, a company run by the same executives.

Air Georgian operated under the Subparts 704 and 705 of the Canadian Aviation Regulations (CAR 704, CAR 705) and had completed the IATA Operational Safety Audit. Air Georgian pilots were represented by the Air Line Pilots Association (ALPA).

History

Air Georgian began as an airport developer in 1985. It began commercial operations in 1994 and subsequently developed its commercial air carrier business, which as of 2011 represented 87 percent of its total business. In 1997 It became a code share partner of Canadian Airlines, operating under the banner of Ontario Regional. Air Georgian was a partner of Canadian Airlines. In 2000 Air Georgian became a Tier III partner of Air Canada and operated as Air Canada Alliance.

It had a long time cargo operation known as Georgian Express which was sold to Cargojet in 2007.

On November 15, 2013, Air Georgian and Regional 1 completed a joint venture through the creation of a parent company, Regional Express Aviation Ltd. (REAL), based in Calgary, Alberta. Air Georgian and R1 both benefit from having access to the world's largest private fleet of Dash 8 and CRJ aircraft, over CAD$100 million in spare parts and domestic maintenance bases located throughout Canada. The joint venture with R1 ended in February 2016.

In December 2013, Air Canada announced that commencing in mid-2014, Air Georgian would operate additional routes in Canada and the United States using Air Canada CRJ-100/200 aircraft.

In 2019, Air Canada indicated it was ending its relationship with the company, consolidating its CRJ regional capacity into the Jazz Aviation operation. On January 31, 2020, Air Georgian filed notice of intent for bankruptcy protection. On March 16, 2020, Air Georgian received court approval for an asset purchase agreement with Pivot Airlines (2746904 Ontario Inc) for substantially all the assets, properties and undertakings of the company. Pivot Airlines is a new company whose CEO as well as Maintenance Operations and Flight Operations Vice Presidents are the same as Air Georgian's. On May 29, 2020, the transaction was completed, however, the June 1 deadline to make a proposal to exit bankruptcy protection passed and no proposal having been made, the company was declared bankrupt the following day.

In the wake of the COVID-19 pandemic, Air Georgian had begun offering repatriation flights.

Fleet
At the time of bankruptcy, the Canadian Civil Aircraft Register showed 14 aircraft registered for Air Georgian Limited. As of August 2021, Transport Canada shows that Air Georgian had operated the following 89 aircraft:

References

External links

 Air Georgian 

Defunct airlines of Canada
Airlines established in 1994
Airlines disestablished in 2020
Air Canada
Air Transport Association of Canada
Companies based in Mississauga
Regional airlines of Ontario
1994 establishments in Ontario
2020 disestablishments in Ontario